Ezhai Uzhavan is a 1952 Indian Tamil-language film directed by K. B. Nagabhushanam. The film stars M. Sriramamurthy and Anjali Devi.

Plot 
A young man in a Zamin village loves a girl. The evil son of the Zamindar also wants that girl. The zamindar's son uses his might and evicts the young man out of the zamin village. The young man returns to the village, over-powers the zamin and gets all the zamin lands to be distributed among the villagers.

Cast 
List adapted from the database of Film News Anandan and from the Encyclopedia of Indian Cinema.

Male cast
M. Sriramamurthy
Relangi
Doraiswamy
Mudigonda Lingamurthy
D. Sadasivarao
C. V. V. Panthulu

Female cast
P. Kannamba
Anjali Devi
Tulasi
T. P. Muthulakshmi
Lakshmiprabha

Production 
The film was produced by K. B. Nagabhushanam who also directed it under the banner Sri Raja Rajeswari Film Company owned by him and P. Kannamba. Kopparapu Subba Rao wrote the story and Udhayakumar wrote the dialogues. Cinematography was done by P. Ellappa. K. R. Sharma was in charge of art direction while Chopra and Vembatti Satyam handled the choreography. The film was shot and processed at Gemini Studios.

The film was produced also in Telugu with the title Pedaraitu.

Soundtrack 
Music was composed by H. R. Padmanabha Sastry while the lyrics were penned by Kavi. Lakshmanadas. There are 13 songs in the film. Playback singers include A. M. Rajah and Jikki.

References 

Indian drama films
Indian multilingual films
1950s Tamil-language films
1952 drama films
1952 films
Films scored by H. R. Padmanabha Sastry